Sean Lake (born 6 December 1991) is an Australian professional racing cyclist.  He won the King of the Mountains jersey on the first stage of the 2016 Tour Down Under. Lake is a two-time Oceania Time trial champion.

Major results
2015
 1st Stage 1 Tour of Tasmania
 1st Stage 1 Tour of Bright
2016
 1st UCI Oceania Tour
 Oceania Road Championships
1st  Time trial
1st  Road race
 3rd Time trial, National Road Championships
2017
 Oceania Road Championships
1st  Time trial
4th Road race
2018
 2nd Time trial Oceania Road Championships

References

External links
 

1991 births
Living people
Australian male cyclists
Cyclists from Melbourne